Miss Peru 2014, the 61st Miss Peru pageant was held on April 12th, 2014 in Parque de la Amistad in Surco, Lima, Peru.
 
The outgoing titleholder, Cindy Mejía of Region Lima crowned her successor Jimena Espinoza of Region Lima at the end of the event. 

The pageant was televised live on Panamericana Televisión in High Definition for the first time in the history of the contest.

Placements

Special Awards

 Best Regional Costume - Cuzco – Nadia Pucce
 Miss Photogenic - Huánuco – Sofía del Pinho
 Miss Elegance - Europe Perú – Rosina Silvestri
 Miss Body - Ica – Elizabeth Márquez 
 Best Hair - Region Lima – Jimena Espinoza Vecco
 Miss Congeniality - Madre de Dios – Debbie López
 Most Beautiful Face - Lambayeque – Ximena Montenegro
 Best Smile - Cuzco – Nadia Pucce
 Miss Internet - Lambayeque – Ximena Montenegro
 Miss Fitness - Pasco – Ducelia Echevarría
 Miss Silhouette - Huánuco – Sofía del Pinho

.

Delegates

Amazonas – Breatzy Andrea Acha Rodríguez
Arequipa – Grecia Natalia Cueva Arredondo
Cajamarca – Morena Verástegui Córdoba 
Callao – Carmen Sifuentes Peña
Cuzco – Nadia Luisa Pucce Fernández
Europe Perú – Rosina Alberta Silvestri 
Huánuco – Sofía del Pinho
Ica – Elizabeth Nicole Márquez Torrelavega
Junín – Stephanie Asunción Chávez Beltrán
La Libertad – María Fernanda Mejía Schioppi
Lambayeque – Ximena Montenegro 
Madre de Dios – Debbie Fabiana López Ordinola
Pasco – Ducelia Echevarría
Piura – Cynthia Yahdira Toth Gutiérrez
Region Lima – Jimena Espinoza Rumini Vecco
San Martín – Brunella Horna
Tumbes – Naomi Shanel León Pérez
Ucayali – Zully Barrantes
USA Peru – María del Pilar Alvarado Heredia

Judges
Dr. Walter Cruzálegui – Plastic Surgeon
Gracia Adrianzen – CEO of Kinko's Producciones
Miguel Camasca – CEO of Padma Spa
Elmer Mathews – Director of Casa de Modas D'Luxe
Nicole Faverón – Miss Perú 2012
Dr. Juan Enrique Bazán –  Director of Centro Oral Clinic
Miguel Montalvo – Manager of Montalvo Salon & Spa
Jimmy Pérez-Johnson – President of Peruanitos Foundation Org.
Luis Miguel Ciccia – Manager of Transportes CIVA
Sandra Arias Schreiber – Image Consultant and Director of Sachs Image
Rider Noriega – Director of NUOVA

Background Music
Opening Show – "Wake Me Up!" by Avicii
Swimsuit Competition – "Happy" by Pharrell Williams
Evening Gown Competition – "Rolling In The Deep" by Adele

Miss World Peru
Miss World Peru 2014  was chosen on August 14, 2013, Elected a year before to improve her training (same as Marina Mora and Elba Fahsbender).
The winner was Sofía Rivera who represented Peru at Miss World 2014.

Placements

Special awards
 Miss Internet – Amazonas – Stephanie Benalcázar
 Miss Attitude – Pasco – Sofía Rivera
 Miss Photogenic – Ucayali – Diana Rengifo
 Miss Congeniality – Arequipa – Cynthia Delgado
 Miss Elegance – Region Lima – Sophía Venero
 Miss Body – Pasco – Sofía Rivera
 Miss Smile – Region Lima – Sophía Venero
 Miss Silhouette – Pasco – Sofía Rivera
 Talent Show Pasco – Sofía Rivera
 Top Model – Region Lima – Sophía Venero
 Beauty with Purpose – Madre de Dios – Verónica Gonzáles
 Sports Award – Piura – Brunella Fossa
 Miss Evolution Anti Age – Amazonas – Stephanie Benalcázar

MWP Delegates

Amazonas – Stephanie Karine Benalcázar Avellaneda
Arequipa – Cynthia Esther Delgado Campos
Ayacucho – Diana Úrsula Ascoy Quezada
Cajamarca – Jimena Valeria Alarcón Carranza
Callao – Almendra Castillo O'Brien
Distrito Capital – Débora Barrantes Brown
Ica – Elizabeth Márquez
Junín – Alejandra Balbuena Gucchioli
La Libertad – Fiorella Valderrama Alonso 
Lambayeque – Mariel Llontop Baldera
Madre de Dios – Verónica Gonzáles Sánchez
Pasco – Sofía Rivera
Piura – Brunella Fossa Gomero
Region Lima – Sophía Venero
Ucayali – Diana Rengifo

MWP Judges
Juan Carlos Zurek – Mayor of La Molina District
Nicole Faverón – Miss Perú 2012 and Director of Nicole Faverón Model Agency and School
Victor Hugo Montalvo – Director and CEO of Montalvo Salon & Spa
Elmer Mathews – Director of Casa de Modas D'Luxe
Olga Zumarán – Miss Perú 1978
Rider Noriega – CEO of Línea Nuova
Mario Alegre – Marketing manager of Personal Training
Dr. Walter Cruzálegui – Plastic Surgeon and Director of Cruzálegui Clinic
Carlos Alberto Medina – CEO of Dermocell
Miguel Camasca – CEO of Padma Spa
Dr. José Ramos – Director of Oftalmosalud Clinic
Dr. Juan Enrique Bazán –  Director of Centro Oral Clinic
Kiko Asto – CEO of Atlantic City Casino
Luis Carlos Cárdenas – CEO of Gli Abiti
Dr. Viviana Guerrero – Dental Surgeon
Gracia Adrianzén – CEO of Kinko's Producciones
Sandra Arias Schreiber – Image Consultant and Director of Sachs Image
Dr. Natalia Córdova – Director of Evolution Anti Age Clinic

References

External links
Official Site

Miss Peru
2014 in Peru
2014 beauty pageants